Elections to Burnley Borough Council in Lancashire, England were held on 1 May 2008.  One third of the council was up for election and the Liberal Democrat party gained overall control of the council from no overall control.

Police launched an investigation on the day of the election into a fake Liberal Democrat leaflet which was distributed in Rosegrove and Gannow wards. Following the election the Labour group leader Andy Tatchell was replaced by Julie Cooper.

After the election, the composition of the council was
Liberal Democrat 23
Labour 12
Conservative 6
British National Party 4

Election result

Ward results

References

2008 Burnley election result
Ward results

2008 English local elections
2008
2000s in Lancashire